Melinaea mneme is a species of butterfly of the family Nymphalidae first described by Carl Linnaeus in 1763. It is found in South America.

Subspecies
 Melinaea mneme mneme (Suriname, Guianas)
 Melinaea mneme mauensis Weymer, 1891 (Brazil)

References

Butterflies described in 1763
Ithomiini
Fauna of Brazil
Nymphalidae of South America
Taxa named by Carl Linnaeus